The Amílcar Cabral Cup was an international association football tournament for Western African nations. The competition originally was played on an annual basis until 1989, since then it was played on a biennial basis.

The tournament is named after Amílcar Cabral. There has been no edition since 2007. Mauritania was to host in 2009, then rescheduled the tournament to 2010 and later cancelled it altogether.

History
In 1970 a predecessor tournament was started. The Tournoi de la Zone II organized by the Conseil Supérieur du Sport en Afrique (CSSA) was held five times until 1977 with Mali winning three and Guinea winning two titles.

Participant Nations
The following eight teams have regularly participated in the tournament. The teams are all in Confederation of African Football's (CAF) Zone 2, i.e. Western Africa. In some years, when a team withdrew a guest team was invited, like Benin in 2001.

Results

 Note: There are contradictory reports of this match. According to the RSSSF page for the 1988 tournament, the match ended in 0–0 and Guinea won 4–2 on penalties. On a list of international matches of 1988, the match ended in 0–0 and Guinea won 3–2 on penalties. According to a head-to-head search between Guinea and Mali on FIFA website, Guinea won 3–2 in regular time.

Most Amílcar Cabral Cup wins

Tournoi de la Zone II
Held from 1970 to 1977 under the hospicies of the Conseil Supérieur du Sport en Afrique (CSSA), the Tournoi de la Zone II was a predecessor tournament of the Amílcar Cabral Cup.

 A round-robin tournament determined the final standings.
 Senegal represented by ASFA Dakar.

References

External links
Details on RSSSF website

 
International association football competitions in West Africa